The 1913–14 season was Newport County's second consecutive season in the Southern League.

Season review

League

Results summary
Note: Two points for a win

Fixtures and results

Southern League Second Division

FA Cup

Welsh Cup

League table

External links
 Newport County Archives

References

 Amber in the Blood: A History of Newport County. 

1913-14
English football clubs 1913–14 season
1913–14 in Welsh football